This is a list of prisons within Beijing municipality of the People's Republic of China. Many are operated by the Beijing Municipal Administration of Prisons.

Sources 

Prisons
 
Beijing